Night of Tarantula (La Notte della Taranta) is a music festival in Salento, Apulia, Italy. 

The Night of Tarantula is focused on Pizzica, a popular folk genre in Salento, and takes place in various municipalities in the province of Lecce and the Grecìa Salentina, especially in Melpignano. It gives great importance to the folk music tradition of Taranta and Pizzica, and it is a resource for tourism in Apulia.

The festival tours around Salento, normally culminating in a grand finale concert in Melpignano in August, which lasts until late night. An average of 120,000 spectators attend the last concert every year. The festival started in 1998 by an initiative of several municipalities of the Salento, which sponsored the event. Every year a new musical director is chosen.

Grecìa Salentina
Folk festivals in Italy
Music festivals established in 1998
Italian traditions